Mike Bubbins  (born 18 April 1972) is a Welsh comedian, writer and actor. He has appeared in various TV projects as himself and acted in several BBC sitcoms. Bubbins makes regular appearances on radio as a character, a professional superfan for hire, and as himself. He has performed stand-up comedy throughout the UK, supporting Rhod Gilbert and Rich Hall. Bubbins has performed his stand-up show "Retrosexual Male" at the Edinburgh Festival and appeared on Stand Up at BBC Wales.

Mike appeared as “The Major” in the 2017 Deep Purple video for “Johnny’s Band”.

Early life 
He was born in Barry, South Wales and attended Barry Boys' Comprehensive.

Career

Television
Bubbins has made various appearances on television as himself, in the documentary Rhod Gilbert: Stand Up to Shyness and on shows such as Jon Richardson: Ultimate Worrier and Eat Your Heart Out With Nick Helm. He acted in BBC sitcoms, including Warren, where he played "Bob" and Josh, where he played the angry driving instructor "Huw." He also played  "Wyn," part of the Wow Wales husband and wife corporate directors team with Mari Beard as long-suffering wife "Charlotte" in BBC Wales sitcom Tourist Trap. He played an exaggerated version of himself alongside John Rutledge (Eggsy of Goldie Lookin Chain) in a spoof paranormal investigation show The Unexplainers on television, radio and a spin-off podcast.

In 2021, Bubbins wrote and starred in a sitcom pilot for BBC Wales, called Mammoth, combining his experiences as a physical education teacher with his love of the 1970s.
In early 2023, Bubbins appeared on Richard Osman's House of Games, winning his week.

Radio
Bubbins has been a guest on BBC Radio Wales panel show What's The Story", which hosted their coverage of the Machynlleth Comedy Festival from 2012 to 2018 and presented and starred in his own show Mike Bubbins: Day Tripper. He co-starred in five series of The Unexplainers with John Rutledge, which subsequently moved to television and had a podcast spin-off. He made several appearances as a guest on BBC 5 Live's Fighting Talk and Blood on the Track and has played various characters on Lucy Beaumont's BBC Radio 4/Radio 2 sitcom To Hull and Back. He played Mr. Lazarus in BBC Radio 4 comedy drama Dangerous Visions: Kafka's Metamorphosis.

In the summer of 2021 Bubbins hosted Nothing Beats the 70s show on Radio Wales drawing on his love of the 1970s, asking his guests to try and disprove his theory that the music and fashion of the 70s made it the best decade.

Bubbins is a former PE Teacher, amateur Rugby Union player and Elvis Tribute Act. He co-hosts The Socially Distant Sports Bar with fellow Welsh comedian Elis James and sports journalist Steff Garrero.

References

External links

1972 births
Welsh comedians
Welsh male television actors
Living people